William Yerger Humphreys (September 9, 1890 – February 26, 1933) was a U.S. Representative from Mississippi.

Early life
William Y. Humphreys was born on September 9, 1890, in Greenville, Washington County, Mississippi. His father was Benjamin G. Humphreys II.

Humphreys attended the public schools and Sewanee Grammar School, Sewanee, Tennessee. He studied law at George Washington University, Washington, D.C., from 1911 to 1914, while in the employ of the United States House of Representatives as assistant superintendent of the House document room.

Career
Humphreys was admitted to the bar on June 1, 1914, and commenced practice in Greenville, Mississippi. He served as first lieutenant in the Chemical Warfare Service of the United States Army during the First World War.

Humphreys was elected as a Democrat to the Sixty-eighth Congress to fill the vacancy caused by the death of his father, Benjamin G. Humphreys II, and served from November 27, 1923, to March 3, 1925. He was not a candidate for renomination in 1924. He resumed the practice of law in Greenville, Mississippi.

Humphreys served as prosecuting attorney of Washington County from 1928 to 1933.

Death
Humphreys died on February 26, 1933, in Greenville, Mississippi. He was interred in Greenville Cemetery.

References

1890 births
1933 deaths
People from Greenville, Mississippi
American people of Welsh descent
Democratic Party members of the United States House of Representatives from Mississippi
20th-century American politicians
George Washington University Law School alumni
United States Army officers